In 1999, the Guana Tolomato Matanzas National Estuarine Research Reserve (GTM Research Reserve) was designated in St. Johns and Flagler counties, Florida as a part of the National Oceanic and Atmospheric Administration (NOAA) National Estuarine Research Reserve (NERR) system. The GTM Research Reserve represents the east Florida sub-region of the Carolinian bioregion. It is one of 29 NERRs in 23 states and one territory. GTM is one of three NERRs in Florida, and is administered on behalf of the state by the Florida Department of Environmental Protection's Florida Coastal Office as part of a network that includes forty-one aquatic preserves, three NERRs, a National Marine Sanctuary, the Coral Reef Conservation Program and the Florida Oceans and Coastal Council. Additional interests are held in the research and management of the GTM and connected preserved or conserved lands including:

 National Oceanic and Atmospheric Administration
 Friends of the GTM
 Florida Fish and Wildlife Commission
 Florida and US Department of Environmental Protection
 University of North Florida, Whitney Laboratory, Marineland
 State, National, Federal, Cit park systems
 St. Johns River Water Management District
 State and Federal Forestry Service

Overview
The GTM Research Reserve boundary encompasses 76,760 acres along the Guana, Tolomato and Matanzas rivers, and the Atlantic Coast. Its mission is "to achieve the conservation of natural biodiversity and cultural resources by using the results of research and monitoring to guide science-based stewardship and education strategies." The GTM Research Reserve was officially designated on August 19, 1999.

A portion of the GTM Research Reserve north of St. Augustine, Florida was formerly known as Guana River State Park. The upland areas include pine flatwoods, maritime hammock, coastal strands  and  dunes,  and mangroves. It is also an important calving ground for the endangered North Atlantic right whale, in addition to being home to aquatic and amphibious wildlife like dolphins, manatees, sea turtles, gopher tortoises, American alligators, indigo snakes and river otters. There are also peregrine falcons, bald eagles, and the endangered Anastasia Island beach mouse (Peromyscus polionotus phasma). Diving and wading birds such as brown and white pelicans, wood storks, and roseate spoonbills can also be viewed.

GTM Research Reserve Visitor Center
The GTM Research Reserve Visitor Center is located at 505 Guana River Road in Ponte Vedra Beach, Florida. It is in the northern component of GTM Research Reserve, ten miles north of St. Augustine on State Road A1A in Ponte Vedra Beach, and serves as the administrative, education, research and stewardship facilities for the northern component of GTM Research Reserve.

The southern component of GTM Research Reserve consists of Pellicer Creek Aquatic Preserve, Faver-Dykes State Park, Washington Oaks Gardens State Park, Moses Creek Conservation Area, Pellicer Creek Conservation Area, Fort Matanzas National Monument, Matanzas State Forest, Princess Place Preserve, The River to Sea Preserve at Marineland, Marsh View Preserve, and other state sovereign submerged lands adjacent to the Matanzas River within its boundary. There is a smaller office building on A1A within the River to Sea Preserve in Marineland.

Recreational activities
There are a lot of recreational activities available like hiking, bicycling, fishing, kayaking and canoeing, dog walking, horseback riding, picnicking, bird watching and nature viewing. Amenities include over nine miles (14 km) of nature trails in an unspoiled natural setting. The reserve also contains seventeen archaeological sites, shell middens at Shell Bluff Landing and Wright's Landing, as well as a prehistoric earthen burial mound. Kayak, bicycle, and fishing boats are available for rent to explore the reserve. North Guana Oupost Operates a rental and tour service on site.

History
The tract was privately owned and open to the public for hunting and fishing prior to state acquisition. During the period of private ownership, the Guana River was dammed in 1957, to flood the upstream marshes in order to enhance wintering waterfowl habitat. The result was the creation of the present-day Guana Lake. The lake water is brackish near its southern terminus at Guana Dam and gradually turns into a freshwater reservoir as one travels away from the dam. Both saltwater and freshwater fish species exist in the same body of water.

The land was purchased from Gate Petroleum with Conservation and Recreational Lands and Save Our Coast funds by the State of Florida in 1984 and divided into Guana River State Park and the Guana River Wildlife Management Area. In 2004 with the construction of the GTM Environmental Education Center, the management of the state park lands was turned over to the GTM Research Reserve to manage as part of the larger research reserve.

Guana Tract
In 2004 the Guana River State Park was acquired by the Guana Tolomato Matanzas National Estuarine Research Reserve and is now included in the reserve. It is no longer a State Park. The research reserve is located along State Highway A1A, between St. Augustine and Jacksonville.

See also
Saint Johns River
Matanzas River

References

External links
 Official site
 Friends of the GTM Reserve - GTM Research Reserve Environmental Education Center
 Guana River Reserve at Wildernet
 Guana Tolomato Matanzas Reserve, Florida
 Guana Tolomato Matanzas National Estuarine Research Reserve

Protected areas of Flagler County, Florida
Estuaries of Florida
Lagoons of Florida
Marshes of Florida
Wetlands of Florida
Protected areas of Florida
Protected areas of St. Johns County, Florida
National Estuarine Research Reserves of Florida
Nature centers in Florida
Landforms of St. Johns County, Florida
Landforms of Flagler County, Florida
1999 establishments in Florida
Protected areas established in 1999